Churchton is an unincorporated community in Anne Arundel County, Maryland, United States.

Natives
Los Angeles based film producer Brian Mercer is a native of Churchton.

Pat's Country Bakery 
Pat's Country Bakery was open from 1982 until 2002. Head baker Kevin Mercer baked the 75th birthday cake for President Ronald Reagan.

References

Unincorporated communities in Anne Arundel County, Maryland
Unincorporated communities in Maryland